Regalerpeton is an extinct genus of cryptobranchoid salamander known from the Early Cretaceous of Huajiying Formation, China. It was first named by Guilin Zhang, Yuan Wang, Marc E.H. Jones and Susan E. Evans in 2009 and the type species is Regalerpeton weichangensis.

References

Cryptobranchoidea
Cretaceous salamanders
Early Cretaceous amphibians
Fossil taxa described in 2009
Prehistoric amphibians of Asia
Taxa named by Wang Yuan
Prehistoric amphibian genera